Raoul Albert Kidumu Mantantu (born 17 November 1946) is a former Congolese football midfielder who played for Zaire in the 1974 FIFA World Cup. He played for Diables Rouges de Thysville and SC Imana.

References

External links
FIFA profile

1946 births
Africa Cup of Nations-winning players
Democratic Republic of the Congo footballers
Democratic Republic of the Congo international footballers
Association football midfielders
Daring Club Motema Pembe players
1974 FIFA World Cup players
1968 African Cup of Nations players
1972 African Cup of Nations players
1974 African Cup of Nations players
1976 African Cup of Nations players
Living people
21st-century Democratic Republic of the Congo people